Bernd Klotz (born 8 September 1958 in Pforzheim) is a German football coach and a former player.

Honours
 Bundesliga: runner-up 1978–79
 (2.Bundesliga): Champions and promotion to Bundesliga (1988-89)

References

External links
 

1958 births
Living people
German footballers
Germany under-21 international footballers
German football managers
VfB Stuttgart players
VfB Stuttgart II players
Borussia Dortmund players
SV Waldhof Mannheim players
Fortuna Düsseldorf players
SC Fortuna Köln players
Bundesliga players
2. Bundesliga players
Association football forwards
Sportspeople from Pforzheim
Footballers from Baden-Württemberg
20th-century German people